Bear suits are a type of costumed character or creature suit resembling a bear. The first bear suits worn by humans were used in shamanic ritual practices by native peoples. In the modern day, they are a popular choice of mascot, and both stylized and realistic bear suits are commonly used in film and on stage, due to the bear's prominent role in the arts and entertainment. Specific types of bear suits are also used in activism, such as polar bear suits to draw attention to the threat of global warming. Bear suits are also commonplace in the furry community.

History 

Masked bearskin costumes were used by shamans in ritual dances by native peoples of the Pacific Northwest, such as the Tlingit, alongside those of other animals.

In Romania, dancers wearing real bearskins are a pre-Christian tradition that is meant to drive away evil spirits.

Modern use 
Bear suits are common as mascots for sports teams, such as Cornell University's Touchdown the Bear, which replaced an actual bear cub that was used up until the 1930s.

Realistic and sometimes animatronic bear suits of all types are typically used in film, or as costumed characters. For the nature film Born in China, the filmmakers themselves were required to wear panda suits in order to get close to pandas that had never seen a human before.

A realistic two-person polar bear suit was created for the 2011 play Greenland by the Royal National Theatre, and was later purchased by Greenpeace for £4,000 via a donation campaign. It was named Paula, and was used in short films and as a costumed character to draw public attention to global warming.

In the Chessington World of Adventures amusement park, one show uses actors wearing animatronic panda suits created by Millennium FX.

Bear suits have also been used in science, as researchers used one to study goats' response to predators both within and outside populated areas, and to study the effects of the increasing presence of polar bears on muskoxen due to global warming. In the Wolong National Nature Reserve in China, keepers wear panda suits to interact with cubs and teach them to live in the wild without relying on humans.

In popular culture 
Bear suits are used in the production of various children's television series, such as Bear in the Big Blue House. In Disneyland, the characters Kenai and Koda from Brother Bear (2003) are portrayed by performers in bear suits. The film Brigsby Bear (2017) revolves around a fictional fake children's television show featuring a performer in a bear suit, which the main character later wears in an attempt to create a movie.

A recurring segment in Late Show with David Letterman featured a "Guy in the Bear Suit" played by Donick Cary, who attempted to perform mundane tasks like hailing a cab for comedic effect.

The character of Smokey Bear is often portrayed by a bear mascot suit in order to spread awareness about wildfires.

According to Wikifur, bears are also a common fursona. They are often chosen for attributes relating to their gluttony or strength.

See also 
 Costumed character
 Creature suit
 Dinosaur suit
 Gorilla suit
 Fursuit

References 

Creature suits
Bears in popular culture